Tianjin Air Cargo Co., Ltd., operating as Tianjin Air Cargo (formerly Sky Cargo Air and Tianjin Cargo Airlines), is a cargo airline in China founded by HNA Group and Tianjin Port Free Trade Zone. The airline received an air operator's certificate (AOC) from the Civil Aviation Administration of China in mid-2018, with services commencing in September that year. It operates out of Tianjin Binhai International Airport with a fleet of Boeing 737 freighters, with plans to expand its fleet size to between 50 and 100 aircraft and launch intercontinental freighter routes in the future.

Destinations
Tianjin Air Cargo serves seven destinations in four countries.

Bangladesh
 Dhaka – Shahjalal International Airport

China
 Nanning – Nanning Wuxu International Airport
 Sanya – Sanya Phoenix International Airport
 Tianjin – Tianjin Binhai International Airport
 Weihai – Weihai Dashuibo Airport
 Xi'an – Xi'an Xianyang International Airport

Singapore
 Singapore – Changi Airport

South Korea
 Seoul – Incheon International Airport

Vietnam 

 Ho Chi Minh City - Tan Son Nhat International Airport
 Hanoi - Noi Bai International Airport

Fleet
In March 2018, Suparna Airlines which owns a 12.86% stake in Tianjin Air Cargo, sold two Boeing 737-400BCFs to the latter allowing commercial services to begin.

As of 15 June 2021, the Tianjin Air Cargo fleet consists of the following aircraft:

References 

Cargo airlines of China